Keith Russell is a Canadian politician in Newfoundland and Labrador and former Minister of Labrador and Aboriginal Affairs. He was elected to the Newfoundland and Labrador House of Assembly in the 2011 provincial election. A member of the Progressive Conservative Party of Newfoundland and Labrador, he represented the Labrador district of Lake Melville until his 2015 election defeat.

Before entering provincial politics Russell was an Ordinary Member for Upper Lake Melville in the Nunatsiavut Government.

Electoral record

|-

|-

|-
 
|NDP
|Arlene Michelin-Pittman
|align="right"|280
|align="right"|9.4%
|align="right"|
|}

|-

|-
 
|NDP
|Arlene Michelin-Pittman
|align="right"|1,211
|align="right"|34.79%
|align="right"|
|-

|}

References

Living people
Progressive Conservative Party of Newfoundland and Labrador MHAs
People from Happy Valley-Goose Bay
1975 births
Inuit politicians
Indigenous leaders in Atlantic Canada
Inuit from Newfoundland and Labrador
21st-century Canadian politicians